This is a list of cricketers who have played matches for the Sui Southern Gas Company cricket team.

 Imran Abbas
 Maqbool Ahmed
 Rizwan Ahmed
 Ammad Alam
 Umar Amin
 Bilal Asad
 Atiq-uz-Zaman
 Haaris Ayaz
 Kashif Bhatti
 Adnan Ghaus
 Azeem Ghumman
 Zafar Gohar
 Ali Hussain
 Mohammad Irfan
 Ahmed Jamal
 Faizan Khan
 Sohail Khan
 Umer Khan
 Adnan Malik
 Muhammad Masroor
 Saeed Bin Nasir
 Muzammil Nizam
 Rajesh Ramesh
 Mohammad Waqas
 Asif Zakir
 Awais Zia
 Ali Imran Zaidi

References 

Lists of Pakistani cricketers